Arihito Muramatsu (村松 有人, born December 12, 1972) is a Japanese former professional baseball outfielder, and current the first squad outfield defense and base coach for the Fukuoka SoftBank Hawks of Nippon Professional Baseball (NPB).

He previously played for the Fukuoka Daiei Hawks, Fukuoka SoftBank and the Orix Buffaloes.

Professional career

Active player era
On November 24, 1990, Muramatsu was drafted  6th round pick by the Fukuoka Daiei Hawks in the  1990 Nippon Professional Baseball draft.

He made his debut in the Pacific League during the 1992 season, playing in 39 games.

In the 1996 season, he led the Pacific League with 58 steals to win the Pacific League stolen base leader and  Pacific League Best Nine Award.

On July 1, 2003, Muramatsu recorded a hit for the cycle. Atsunori Inaba of the Yakult Swallows also recorded a hit  for the cycle on the same day, the first time in NPB history. He also finished fifth all-time in NPB records with 13 triples. And he had won the Japanese Golden Glove award in outfield from 2003 to 2004.

Starting in the 2004 season he exercised his free agent rights and joined the Orix Buffaloes, where he played for five seasons until the 2008 season.

In the 2009 season, Muramatsu returned to the Hawks in a trade for Naoyuki Ohmura, played two seasons, and retired after the 2010 season.

Muramatsu played in 1673 games during his 20-season career, batting average .277 with 1380 hits, 18 home runs, 393 RBI, and 270 stolen bases.

After retirement
After his retirement, Muramatsu became the scout in charge of the Tokai region for the Fukuoka Softbank Hawks.

He had been the third squad outfield defense and base coach since the 2014 season and the first squad outfield defense and base coach since the 2017 season.

International career
Muramathu joined the Japan national baseball team for the 2004 Summer Olympics, and won a bronze medal.

On February 6, 2015, he was appointed as Japan national baseball team's outfield defense and base running coach for the GLOBAL BASEBALL MATCH 2015 Samurai Japan vs. Europe.

References

External links

 Career statistics - NPB.jp 
 93 Arihito Muramatsu PLAYERS2022 - Fukuoka SoftBank Hawks Official site

1972 births
Baseball players at the 2004 Summer Olympics
Fukuoka Daiei Hawks players
Fukuoka SoftBank Hawks players
Japanese baseball coaches
Japanese expatriate baseball players in the United States
Living people
Medalists at the 2004 Summer Olympics
Nippon Professional Baseball coaches
Nippon Professional Baseball outfielders
Olympic baseball players of Japan
Olympic bronze medalists for Japan
Olympic medalists in baseball
Orix BlueWave players
Orix Buffaloes players
People from Kanazawa, Ishikawa
Salinas Spurs players